Funk Branch is a stream in Iron and Reynolds counties in the U.S. state of Missouri. It is a tributary of the Black River.

The stream headwaters arise in western Iron County (at ) and its confluence with the Black River is in eastern Reynolds County (at ). The source area of the stream lies about two miles south of Annapolis The confluence lies within the waters of the north end of Clearwater Lake.

Funk Branch has the name of a pioneer citizen.

See also
List of rivers of Missouri

References

Rivers of Iron County, Missouri
Rivers of Reynolds County, Missouri
Rivers of Missouri
Tributaries of the Black River (Arkansas–Missouri)